Kap or KAP may refer to:

People
 K. Appavu Pillai (1911–1973), Indian politician
 Gabe Kapler (born 1975), American baseball player

Places
 Kąp, Gmina Giżycko, Poland
 Kąp, Gmina Miłki, Poland

Organizations
 Communist Workers Party (Denmark)
 Katter's Australian Party
 Kink Aware Professionals, a program run by the National Coalition for Sexual Freedom
 Kiribati Adaptation Program
 Aluminium Plant Podgorica, Montenegro

Transport
 Kalianpur railway station, Uttar Pradesh, India (Indian Railways station code)
 King Albert Park MRT station, Singapore (MRT station abbreviation)

Other
 Kap language
 Kap (poetry), a form of Thai poetry
 Ketamine-assisted psychotherapy
 Kite aerial photography
 Kent Access Permit, for lorries entering Kent, England